The Towers is a  mountain located on the border of Alberta and British Columbia on the Continental Divide. It also straddles the shared boundary of Banff National Park with Mount Assiniboine Provincial Park. It was named in 1917 by Arthur O. Wheeler. Its nearest higher peak is Mount Magog,  to the west.

Geology

The Towers is composed of sedimentary rock laid down from the Precambrian to Jurassic periods. Formed in shallow seas, this sedimentary rock was pushed east and over the top of younger rock during the Laramide orogeny.

Climate

Based on the Köppen climate classification, The Towers is located in a subarctic climate with cold, snowy winters, and mild summers.

See also
 List of peaks on the Alberta–British Columbia border

References

Two-thousanders of Alberta
Two-thousanders of British Columbia
Canadian Rockies